2022 Korea Open may refer to:

2022 Korea Open (badminton)
2022 Korea Open (tennis)